La Condomina is a multi-use stadium in Murcia, Spain. The stadium holds 6,500 spectators and it is currently used mostly for football matches and music concerts.

History
La Condomina was built in 1924 with an initial capacity of 16,800 spectators.

Real Murcia played at La Condomina for over 80 years before moving the Estadio Nueva Condomina in October 2006. Ciudad de Murcia played at the stadium throughout its existence.

In 1995, Real Murcia sold the stadium to the town hall for solving the financial trouble of the club.

Due to the danger of collapse of various stands, La Condomina was only allowed to host 4,500 spectators, until 2016, when UCAM Murcia promoted to Segunda División and financed the renovation of the stadium to meet the requirements of the LFP. La Condomina currently has a capacity of 6,500 seats.

References

External links
Estadios de Espana 

Football venues in the Region of Murcia
Ciudad de Murcia
Real Murcia
UCAM Murcia CF
Sport in Murcia
Sports venues completed in 1924
Rugby union stadiums in Spain